Taniele Gofers (born 12 June 1985) is an Australian water polo player. She was a member of the Australia women's national water polo team that won a bronze medal at the 2008 Beijing Olympics.

Prior to winning bronze at the 2008 Beijing Olympics, she won a gold medal at the FINA Women's Water Polo World Cup in 2006 as well as a silver medal at the FINA World Aquatics Championships in 2007.

Taniele Gofers was ranked 57th in the 2013 book "Greatest Water Polo Players to Ever Play the Game: Top 100" by Alex Trost & Vadim Kravetsky

Taniele Gofers is the sister of Australian Water Polo player Keesja Gofers and Australian Handball player Allira Hudson-Gofers.

Taniele Gofers has an accomplished second career as a key member of the United Nations Office for Project Services (UNOPS) in Myanmar where she manages the Fund Directors Office and Communications playing a key role for the Access to Health Fund. Previously, she's also worked as the communications officer at the Three Millennium Development Goal Fund.

See also
 List of Olympic medalists in water polo (women)
 List of World Aquatics Championships medalists in water polo

References

External links
 

1985 births
Living people
Australian female water polo players
Olympic bronze medalists for Australia in water polo
Water polo players at the 2008 Summer Olympics
Medalists at the 2008 Summer Olympics
People educated at MLC School
21st-century Australian women
Water polo players from Sydney
Sportswomen from New South Wales
Australian expatriates in Myanmar
University of Sydney alumni